Charles Ernest Grassley (born September 17, 1933) is an American politician serving as the president pro tempore emeritus of the United States Senate, and the senior United States senator from Iowa, having held the seat since 1981. In 2022, he was reelected to his eighth Senate term, having first been elected in 1980. He is the longest serving Republican in U.S. Senate history, having overtaken Orrin Hatch’s record in January 2023. He is also the sixth-longest-serving U.S. senator in history.

A member of the Republican Party, Grassley served eight terms in the Iowa House of Representatives (1959–1975) and three terms in the United States House of Representatives (1975–1981). He has served three stints as Senate Finance Committee chairman during periods of Republican Senate majority. When Orrin Hatch's Senate term ended on January 3, 2019, following his retirement, Grassley became the most senior Republican in the Senate and its president pro tempore. Upon Patrick Leahy's retirement in January 2023, he became the most senior member of the Senate.

During his four decades in the Senate, Grassley has chaired the Senate Finance Committee, the Senate Narcotics Committee, the Senate Judiciary Committee, and the Senate Aging Committee.

Early life and education 
Grassley was born in New Hartford, Iowa, the son of Ruth (née Corwin) and Louis Arthur Grassley, and raised on a farm. He graduated from the town high school. At Iowa State Teachers College (now the University of Northern Iowa), he earned a Bachelor of Arts in 1955 and a Master of Arts in political science in 1956. During his time as a student, Grassley joined the social-professional Alpha Gamma Rho fraternity. He pursued a Ph.D. in political science at the University of Iowa, but ultimately did not complete the degree.

Early career 
During the 1950s, Grassley farmed and worked in factories in Iowa, first as a sheet metal shearer and then as an assembly line worker. From 1967 to 1968, he taught at Charles City College.

Grassley represented parts of Butler County in the Iowa House of Representatives from 1959 to 1975. He then served in the United States House of Representatives from 1975 to 1981.

U.S. Senate

Elections

1980 

Grassley was first elected to the Senate in 1980, defeating Democratic incumbent John Culver.

1986 

Grassley was reelected in 1986, defeating the Democratic nominee, attorney John P. Roehrick, in a landslide.

1992 

Grassley was reelected in 1992, defeating Democratic State Senator Jean Hall Lloyd-Jones.

1998 

Grassley was reelected in 1998, defeating former State Representative David Osterberg, who won the Democratic nomination unopposed.

2004 

Grassley was reelected in 2004, defeating former State Senator Arthur A. Small.

2010 

Grassley sought a sixth term in the 2010 election. He was challenged by Democrat Roxanne Conlin, a former United States attorney, and Libertarian John Heiderscheit, an attorney.

Grassley was unopposed in the Republican primary, although some conservatives said he had drifted "too far to the left".

Grassley was reelected with 64.5% of the vote to Conlin's 33.2%. He carried every county in the state except Johnson County, which contains the University of Iowa. He is only the second Iowan to serve six terms in the Senate, the other being Iowa's longest-serving senator, William B. Allison.

2016 

Grassley sought a seventh term in the 2016 election. He was expected to face a strong challenge from former Democratic lieutenant governor Patty Judge, but won his seventh term with over 60% of the vote as Republican presidential nomineee Donald Trump won Iowa with over 51% of the vote.

2022 

In May 2021, Grassley said that he would not decide whether to run for reelection in 2022 until between eight and 12 months before the election. Given Iowa's swing nature and Grassley's strong results in past elections, many believed that an open seat in Iowa would benefit the Democrats as they could convince many Grassley supporters to vote for their nominee. In July 2021, former U.S. Representative Abby Finkenauer announced that she would run for the seat regardless of Grassley's decision and criticized him and Republican Senate leader Mitch McConnell for being "obsessed with power" and not taking a strong stance against those who breached the Capitol in the January 6 United States Capitol attack.

In September 2021, Grassley announced his intention to run for an eighth term. His announcement was viewed as advantageous to Republicans seeking to hold Grassley's seat and to retake the Senate majority in 2022. He won the general election, defeating Democratic nominee Michael Franken on November 8, 2022.

Tenure

1980–1989 

In November 1981, Grassley was one of 32 senators to sign a letter to President Reagan supporting Director of the Office of Management and Budget David Stockman. In August 1982, while the Reagan administration tried persuading senators to approve legislation authorizing the creation of a radio station for broadcasting to Cuba, Grassley joined fellow Iowa senator Roger Jepsen and Edward Zorinsky in seeking an amendment to the bill barring the Reagan administration from operating Radio Marti on that frequency or other commercial AM frequencies.

In October 1983, Grassley voted against establishing a legal holiday to commemorate Martin Luther King Jr.'s birthday. In 2015, an aide to Grassley said that he voted against the holiday due to an "economic decision both in the cost to the broader economy in lost productivity, and the cost to the taxpayers with the federal government closed." In 2004, Grassley co-sponsored legislation giving King a posthumous award, which became law on October 25 that year.

On November 1, 1984, Grassley signed a one-page citation of contempt of Congress against Attorney General William French Smith due to Smith's not turning over files on an investigation into Navy shipbuilding. Assistant Attorney General Stephen S. Trott called the citation "out of place" since Grassley was not acting at a session of the Judiciary panel he led.

In May 1987, the Senate Appropriations Committee defeated an attempt by Grassley to hasten payments of corn and other feed grain subsidies ahead of the scheduled payment taking place after October 1. The Grassley measure was also designed to unravel an accounting device lawmakers used previously to make it appear that they were reducing spending for the incoming fiscal year. In October, during a press briefing, Grassley accused Reagan of being "asleep at the switch" and botching the handling of Robert Bork's Supreme Court nomination, adding that Bork's nomination had convinced him that the Reagan administration "has been terribly lucky for the last seven years" in other matters, including the economy and foreign policy. Later that month, Grassley likened the groups lobbying against Bork's nomination to the McCarthyism of the 1950s: "The big lie is standard operating procedure for some of these groups. All you have to do is repeat the same outrageous charges, and repeat them so often that people believe they are true." In November, as party leaders of the Senate Judiciary Committee met on the Supreme Court nomination of Douglas H. Ginsburg, Grassley released the text of a letter he intended to send to the American Bar Association suggesting the association was dragging its feet in reviewing Ginsburg's record. After Ginsburg admitted having smoked marijuana, Grassley said, "You like to think people who are appointed to the Supreme Court respect the law." Grassley joined Jesse Helms in resisting the nomination of Anthony Kennedy, Reagan's next choice for the Supreme Court, saying that he would have preferred another nominee such as appeals court justices Pasco Bowman II or John Clifford Wallace. Grassley stated his distaste for "the people who are committed to changing the judiciary" and taking "the path of least resistance."

In January 1989, as the Senate voted to schedule a vote within the following month on the pay increase, Grassley questioned how senators would decline federal program increases "come March and April if the first thing out of the box is a pay raise?" In February, he was one of six senators to testify against the 50% pay increase scheduled to take effect the following week. In October, Grassley was one of nine senators to vote against legislation intended to outlaw flag burning and other forms of flag defacement and joined Bob Dole and Orrin Hatch, the other two Republicans to vote against the bill, in voicing a preference for a constitutional amendment.

1990–1999 

In January 1991, Grassley was one of only two Republican senators to vote against joining the international coalition to force Iraq out of Kuwait, the other being Mark Hatfield of Oregon. In August 1991, he became one of six Republicans on the Select Senate Committee on POW-MIA Affairs that would investigate the number of Americans still missing in the aftermath of the Vietnam War following renewed interest. In July 1998, President Bill Clinton listed Grassley among the members of Congress who had made it possible "for me to sign into law today the Internal Revenue Service Restructuring and Reform Act." On February 12, 1999, Grassley was one of 50 senators to vote to convict and remove Bill Clinton from office.

2000–2009 

In May 2001, Grassley met with Democratic senator Max Baucus over the allocation of finances in tax cuts and both reported they were making progress in reaching a bipartisan deal, Grassley adding that the bill would contain all four of the main elements proposed by the Bush administration and the Senate Finance Committee would modify the components of the Bush proposal.

In August 2002, Grassley sent a letter to president and chief executive of the United Way of America Brian Gallagher requesting a detailed explanation on the overseeing of both finances and management of the organization's affiliates. Grassley also wrote to chief executive of the United Way of the National Capital Area Norman O. Taylor in regards to allegations of affiliates misappropriating money as well as withholding information the board needed to allow its conducting of oversight.

As a senior member of the Senate Finance Committee, Grassley has spearheaded many probes into alleged misuse and lack of accountability of federal money. In July 2007, a Grassley-commissioned report was released claiming that more than US$1 billion in farm subsidies were sent to deceased individuals. Grassley was called a "Taxpayer Super Hero" in 2014 by the Council for Citizens Against Government Waste. He received a 100 percent rating from the group that year and has a lifetime rating of 78 percent. Grassley was ranked the 5th most bipartisan Senator of the 114th United States Congress and the 7th most bipartisan Senator in the first session of the 115th Congress by the Bipartisan Index, a metric created by the Lugar Center for the Lugar Center and Georgetown's McCourt School of Public Policy to rank members of the United States Congress by their degree of bipartisanship.

In February 2004, Grassley released an internal report composed by the FBI in 2000 that examined 107 instances of either serious or criminal misconduct by its agents over a 16-year period. In a letter to the FBI, Grassley called the report "a laundry list of horrors with examples of agents who committed rape, sexual crimes against children, other sexual deviance and misconduct, attempted murder of a spouse, and narcotics violations, among many others" and added that the report's findings raised questions about whether the FBI handled agents "soon enough and rigorously enough".

On June 28, 2006, Grassley proposed legislation intended to curb sex trafficking and sexual slavery in the United States by means of strict enforcement of tax laws, for example by requiring a W-2 form be filed for each prostitute managed by a pimp or other employer.

Since 1976, Grassley has repeatedly introduced measures that increase the level of taxation on American citizens living abroad, including retroactive tax hikes. Grassley was eventually able to attach an amendment to a piece of legislation that went into effect in 2006, which increased taxes on Americans abroad by targeting housing and living incentives paid by foreign employers and held them accountable for federal taxes, even though they did not currently reside in the United States. Critics of the amendment felt that the move hurt Americans competing for jobs abroad by putting an unnecessary tax burden on foreign employers. Others felt that the move was only to offset the revenue deficit caused by domestic tax cuts of the Bush Administration.

In March 2009, amid a scandal that involved AIG executives receiving large salary bonuses from the taxpayer-funded bailout of AIG, Grassley suggested that those AIG employees receiving large bonuses should follow the so-called 'Japanese example', resign immediately or commit suicide. After some criticism, he dismissed the comments as rhetoric.

In May 2009, Grassley cosponsored a resolution to amend the US Constitution to prohibit flag burning.

When President Barack Obama and the Democratic Party proposed a health reform bill featuring mandated health insurance, Grassley opposed the health insurance mandate, saying that it was a deal breaker. In response to an audience question at an August 12, 2009, meeting in Iowa, about the end-of-life counseling provisions in the House health care bill, Grassley said people were right to fear that the government would "pull the plug on grandma." Grassley had previously supported covering end-of-life counseling, having voted for the Medicare Prescription Drug, Improvement, and Modernization Act of 2003, which stated: "The covered services are: evaluating the beneficiary's need for pain and symptom management, including the individual's need for hospice care; counseling the beneficiary with respect to end-of-life issues and care options, and advising the beneficiary regarding advanced care planning." In December 2009, he voted against the Patient Protection and Affordable Care Act (commonly called Obamacare or the Affordable Care Act). It was later reported that Grassley had notified Obama that he would vote against the Affordable Care Act even had the bill been modified to include all of the proposed modifications Grassley had proposed.

2010–2020 
In January 2010, Grassley was one of seven Senate Republicans to sign a letter warning the White House about their serious reservations with Director of the Transportation Security Administration nominee Erroll Southers due to conflicting accounts Southers gave the Senate about his previous tapping of databases for information about his ex-wife's boyfriend in the late 1980s.

In December 2010, Grassley was one of 26 senators who voted against the ratification of New START, a nuclear arms reduction treaty between the United States and Russian Federation obliging both countries to have no more than 1,550 strategic warheads as well as 700 launchers deployed during the next seven years along with providing a continuation of on-site inspections that halted when START I expired the previous year. It was the first arms treaty with Russia in eight years.

In April 2013, Grassley opposed a gun control amendment authored by Senators Joe Manchin and Pat Toomey, and instead proposed alternative legislation to increase prosecutions of gun violence and increase reporting of mental health data in background checks.

On March 9, 2015, Grassley was one of 47 senators to sign a letter to Iran led by Tom Cotton to rebuke the Joint Comprehensive Plan of Action. In June 2015, Grassley introduced legislation to help protect taxpayers from alleged abuses by the Internal Revenue Service. The legislation was proposed in response to recent events involving alleged inappropriate conduct by employees at the IRS but was opposed by Democrats.

Since first taking office in 1981, Grassley has held public meetings in all of Iowa's 99 counties each year, even after losing honorarium payments for them in 1994. This has led to the coinage of the term "full Grassley," to describe when a United States presidential candidate visits all 99 counties of Iowa before the Iowa caucuses.

In 2018, Grassley suggested that no women were serving on the Senate Judiciary Committee because of the heavy workload. The following week, Grassley added that he would "welcome more women" to serve on the Committee "because women as a whole are smarter than most male senators. And they work real hard, too."

In July 2018, after President Donald Trump nominated Brett Kavanaugh to the Supreme Court, Grassley lauded Kavanaugh as "one of the most qualified Supreme Court nominees to come before the Senate", and said that critics of Kavanaugh should lessen their confidence in how he would vote given past surprises in voting by members of the Court.

In 2016, Senate Republicans refused to consider Obama's nomination of Merrick Garland to the Supreme Court. At the time, Grassley said that the "American people shouldn't be denied a voice" in the nomination, which was "too important to get bogged down in politics". In 2020, after a Supreme Court vacancy arose due to Justice Ruth Bader Ginsburg's death, Grassley supported a prompt vote on Trump's nominee, backing the decision of "the current chairman of the Judiciary Committee and the Senate Majority Leader".

2021–present 

Grassley was participating in the certification of the 2021 United States Electoral College vote count when Trump supporters attacked the U.S. Capitol. He was removed from the Senate chamber and taken to a secure location when rioters entered the building. In the wake of the attack, Grassley said that Trump "displayed poor leadership in his words and actions, and he must take responsibility." He said efforts to impeach Trump would risk "further disunity" and that "the country must take steps to tone down political rhetoric and mend divisions." In response, The Gazette editorial board wrote that Grassley and other Iowa Republicans "must reckon with why they did the wrong thing for so long."

Senate record for consecutive votes 
As of November 2015, Grassley had cast 12,000 votes, and as of July 2012, he had missed only 35 votes in his Senate career. In January 2016, he set a record for the most time without a missed roll-call vote, having not missed one since July 1993, when he was touring Iowa with President Bill Clinton to survey flood damage. In November 2020, this streak came to an end after over 27 years and 8,927 votes when he quarantined after being exposed to COVID-19. Grassley broke Senator William Proxmire's record for most time without a missed vote, but Proxmire holds the record for most consecutive roll-call votes, with 10,252.

Committee assignments 
Grassley's committee assignments for the 118th Congress are as follows:
 Committee on Agriculture, Nutrition, and Forestry
 Subcommittee on Commodities, Markets and Trade
 Subcommittee on Rural Development and Energy
 Committee on Finance
 Subcommittee on Fiscal Responsibility and Economic Growth (Ranking Member)
 Subcommittee on Health Care
 Subcommittee on Taxation and IRS Oversight
 Committee on the Budget (Ranking Member)
 Committee on the Judiciary
 Subcommittee on Competition Policy, Antitrust, and Consumer Rights
 Subcommittee on Criminal Justice and Counterterrorism
 Subcommittee on Federal Courts, Oversight, Agency Action, and Federal Rights
 Subcommittee on Immigration, Citizenship, and Border Safety
 Joint Committee on Taxation 
 United States Senate Caucus on International Narcotics Control (Vice Chair)

Caucus membership 
 Senate Republican Conference

Political positions

Abortion 
Grassley has said that he considers himself pro-life and has expressed concern about the potential for abortions to be paid for with federal funds. In December 1981, he voted for a proposed constitutional amendment by Orrin Hatch that would allow both Congress and the states to ban or regulate abortion. In 2019, he co-sponsored reintroducing the Pain-Capable Unborn Child Protection Act. Grassley approved of the 2022 overturning of Roe v. Wade, saying it empowered people through their elected representatives to make "commonsense policy decisions."

Agriculture 
In April 2019, Grassley was one of seven senators to sign a letter led by Debbie Stabenow and Joni Ernst to United States secretary of agriculture Sonny Perdue urging the Agriculture Department to implement conservation measures in the 2018 Farm Bill "through a department-wide National Water Quality Initiative, which would build off the existing initiative housed at the Natural Resource Conservation Service."

Antitrust 
In October 2021, Grassley and Senator Amy Klobuchar introduced the American Innovation and Choice Online Act (S.2992) . The legislation aims to prevent Big Tech companies from engaging in anti-competitive behavior by "self-preferencing" their products. Grassley voted to confirm Jonathan Kanter as Assistant Attorney General for the Department of Justice Antitrust Division.

Energy and environment 
Grassley has expressed concern about the impact of regulations by the Environmental Protection Agency on farming. He stated that it has a "public relations problem" with "the ethanol industry, corn farmers and [himself]". He also stated that the EPA has "screwed" farmers with 31 biofuel exemptions. On December 19, 2019, after the EPA withdrew a new Renewable Fuel Standard (RFS) rule, Grassley criticized the EPA for "playing games and not helping President Trump with farmers".

In 1992, Grassley authored EPACT 1992, which created the federal wind energy tax credit.

In 2005, Grassley authored the tax title of EPACT 2005 when he was chairman of the Senate Finance Committee. On June 28, 2005, he voted for the bill. On June 19, 2007, Grassley helped expand tax incentives that produces energy from alternative sources including ethanol, wind, biomass, and biodiesel. On June 21, 2007, Grassley voted for the Energy Independence and Security Act of 2007, which expanded other energy tax incentives through 2013.

In September 2015, Grassley received the Dr. Harold D. Prior "Friend of Iowa Wind Energy" award from the Iowa Wind Energy Association for his commitment to supporting wind energy development in Iowa.

In 2017, the Environmental Working Group stated that Grassley received $367,763 in grain commodity subsidies over 21 years.

Grassley supports federal ethanol subsidies.

In 2017, regarding the Paris Agreement, Grassley stated that "unequal terms put the U.S. economy at a significant disadvantage while letting large economies like China’s and India’s off the hook." Grassley also stated that he didn't like that the agreement was never voted upon by the Senate.

Estate taxes 
Grassley is in favor of repealing the estate tax, which is a tax on inherited assets above $5.5 million for individuals and $11 million for couples. He has argued that the estate tax is potentially ruinous for farmers and small business owners. According to the Des Moines Register, Grassley's argument does not "match the reality found in federal tax data – particularly for Iowa. The estate tax applies to around 5,000 taxpayers across the entire country each year, and very few of them come from Iowa. Of the Iowans subject to the tax, only a fraction are actually farmers, and a vanishingly small number of them face a tax bill requiring them to sell off farmland or other assets... The number of small businesses impacted by the estate tax is similarly small."

Gun law 

In 2010, Grassley had an "A" rating from the National Rifle Association (NRA). According to a source from Splinter News, Grassley received $9,900 from the NRA during his 2016 election.

Grassley is a staunch believer that gun laws will not prevent gun deaths or gun-related violence without improved mental health care. Grassley opposed the Manchin-Toomey gun control amendment, and instead proposed alternative legislation to increase prosecutions of gun violence and increase reporting of mental health data in background checks.

In 2016, one month after the Orlando nightclub shooting, Grassley proposed legislation to expand state-to-state access to background check data and to make it illegal for government officials to sell criminals guns as part of sting operations. Both proposals were rejected by the Senate. Additionally, he voted against the Democrats' Feinstein Amendment, which would make it illegal to sell guns to individuals on the terror watchlist and a Republican-sponsored bill that expanded funding for background checks.

In early 2017, Grassley sponsored legislation that expanded access to mentally disabled individuals, claiming that the previous ban against mentally ill individuals purchasing guns "mistreats disabled Americans." In response to the 2017 Las Vegas shooting, Grassley stated that it was unlikely that gun laws would change in the wake of the shooting due to Congress being Republican-dominated. A day after the Douglas High School shooting in Parkland, Florida, Grassley said the government had not done enough to prevent individuals with a mental illness from obtaining firearms.

Health care 
Grassley opposes the Affordable Care Act and has voted to repeal it. Before its passage, he had supported the individual mandate in health care reform. Grassley engaged in lengthy negotiations with the Obama administration, as it sought health care reform with support from Republican members of Congress. These negotiations produced nothing that Grassley would support, leading Democrats to characterize Grassley's efforts as intended to delay or scupper health care reform rather than produce compromise legislation. In Obama's memoir, he describes an exchange between him and Grassley in the Oval Office as he sought to reach a compromise with Grassley. Obama asked, "If Max [Baucus] took every one of your latest suggestions, could you support the bill?... Are there any changes—any at all—that would get us your vote?", to which Grassley responded, "I guess not, Mr. President."

In July 2017, Grassley stated that Senate Republicans should be ashamed of not having repealed the ACA, and said this could result in a loss of their majority in the 2018 elections.

In August 2018, Grassley was one of ten Republican senators to cosponsor legislation intended to protect ACA provisions for people with preexisting conditions. Health experts said the bill did not prevent insurers from excluding coverage for people with preexisting conditions.

Marijuana legalization 
In 2015, Grassley voiced his opposition to a bipartisan senate bill, the Compassionate Access, Research Expansion, and Respect States Act, that would move cannabis from Schedule I to Schedule II. This bill would allow states with medical cannabis laws to legally prescribe it and allow for more research into its medical efficacy. In 2019, along with Democratic U.S. Senators Dianne Feinstein and Brian Schatz, Grassley introduced the Cannabidiol and Marijuana Research Expansion Act, which would expand research into medical marijuana.

Military 
Grassley has voiced objections to the Special Immigrant Visa program, which resettles translators and their family members who face risks to their lives due to their work with the U.S. Military.

Israel Anti-Boycott Act 
In April 2017, Grassley co-sponsored the Israel Anti-Boycott Act (s. 720), which would make it a federal crime for Americans to encourage or participate in boycotts against Israel and Israeli settlements in the West Bank if protesting actions by the Israeli government. In 2019, Grassley was one of 14 Republican senators to sign a letter from Marco Rubio that involved condemning the BDS movement.

LGBT rights 
In 2015, after the Supreme Court ruled same-sex marriage bans unconstitutional in Obergefell v. Hodges, Grassley released a statement saying he believed marriage was between one man and a woman and criticized the court for not leaving the issue up to the states. But in 2022, he said in a statement that he supports same-sex marriage. Despite this, Grassley voted against the Respect for Marriage Act, citing religious liberty concerns and calling the legislation unnecessary.

Retirement planning 
In 2019, Grassley was one of the lead Senate co-sponsors of the SECURE Act of 2019. This bill, which became law as part of the fiscal year 2020 federal appropriations law signed in late December 2019, was intended to incentivize retirement planning, diversify the options available to savers, and increase access to tax-advantaged savings programs including 529 plans.

Russian interference in 2016 elections 

In February 2017, Grassley said that while Russian interference in U.S. elections was "bothersome", the United States did not have clean hands and had, for instance, interfered with the 1948 Italian election. In May 2017 after Trump fired FBI director James Comey, Grassley advised people suspicious of the Trump administration to "Suck it up and move on."
On October 31, 2017, while a group of Republicans were facing questions from reporters concerning recent indictments, Grassley ignored the questions and left the room.

In January 2018, and in the first known congressional criminal referral in the investigation into Russian interference in the 2016 election, Grassley, along with Lindsey Graham, recommended charges against Christopher Steele, one of the people who sought to expose Russian interference. Grassley and Graham said that they had reason to believe that Steele had lied to federal authorities. According to The New York Times, "It was not clear why, if a crime is apparent in the F.B.I. reports that were reviewed by the Judiciary Committee, the Justice Department had not moved to charge Mr. Steele already. The circumstances under which Mr. Steele is alleged to have lied were unclear, as much of the referral was classified."

In January 2018, when Grassley and Judiciary Committee Republicans were refusing to release the full transcript of an August 2017 ten-hour interview that the Judiciary Committee had conducted with Glenn Simpson, Senator Dianne Feinstein, the top Democrat on the Senate Judiciary Committee, released the full transcript unilaterally. Simpson is the co-founder of the political opposition research firm Fusion GPS, which produced the so-called Steele Dossier on alleged connections between Trump and Russia. Grassley condemned Feinstein, saying that her decision was "confounding" and that it deterred future witnesses in the Russia 2016 investigation. Simpson himself had requested that the full transcript of his interview be released, saying that Republicans had selectively leaked portions of the testimony to conservative media outlets in order to portray Simpson in a negative light and discredit the Steele dossier.

Trade 
In January 2018, Grassley was one of 36 Republican senators to sign a letter to President Trump requesting he preserve the North American Free Trade Agreement by modernizing it for the economy of the 21st century.

Whistleblowers 
The author of the Whistleblower Protection Act of 1989, Grassley has campaigned to increase protection and provide support for "whistleblowers". He has supported a number of FBI whistleblowers, including Coleen Rowley, Sibel Edmonds, and Jane Turner, although not supporting Department of Defense whistleblower Noel Koch.

Grassley received a lifetime achievement award on May 17, 2007, from the National Whistleblower Center.
In April 2014, Grassley announced plans to create a caucus in the Senate dedicated to strengthening whistleblower protections.

Grassley defended the whistleblower in the Trump–Ukraine scandal, breaking with his party line, when he declared on October 1, 2019, that the whistleblower "appears to have followed the whistleblower protection laws and ought to be heard out and protected."

After whistleblowers Colonel Alexander Vindman and Ambassador Gordon Sondland testified against Donald Trump and were subsequently fired, Grassley defended Trump's firing of both whistleblowers on the grounds that their firing was not retaliatory.

Donald Trump
On May 28, 2021, Grassley voted against creating an independent commission to investigate the January 6 United States Capitol attack. Later that year, Grassley campaigned with Donald Trump.

Investigations

Religious organizations 

On November 5, 2007, Grassley announced an investigation into the tax-exempt status of six ministries under the leadership of Benny Hinn, Paula White, Eddie L. Long, Joyce Meyer, Creflo Dollar, and Kenneth Copeland by the United States Senate Committee on Finance. In letters to each ministry, Grassley asked for the ministries to divulge specific financial information to the committee to determine whether or not funds collected by each organization were inappropriately utilized by ministry heads. By the December 6, 2007 deadline, only three of the ministries had shown compliance with the Finance Committee's request. On March 11, 2008, Grassley and Finance chairman Max Baucus sent follow-up letters to Kenneth Copeland, Creflo Dollar and Eddie Long, explaining that the Senate reserved the right to investigate the finances of their organizations under federal tax laws.

Medical research 
Grassley also began an investigation about unreported payments to physicians by pharmaceutical companies. Grassley led a 2008 Congressional Investigation which found that well-known university psychiatrists, who had promoted psychoactive drugs, had violated federal and university regulations by secretly receiving large sums of money from the pharmaceutical companies which made the drugs. The New York Times reported that Joseph Biederman of Harvard University had failed to report over a million dollars of income that he had received from pharmaceutical companies. Weeks later, Business Week reported that Grassley alleged that Alan Schatzberg, chair of psychiatry at Stanford University, had underreported his investments in Corcept Therapeutics, a company he founded. Schatzberg had reported only $100,000 investments in Corcept, but Grassley stated that his investments actually totalled over $6 million. Schatzberg later stepped down from his grant which is funded by the National Institutes of Health (NIH).

Similarly, Charles Nemeroff resigned as chair of the psychiatry department at Emory University after failing to report a third of the $2.8 million in consulting fees he received from GlaxoSmithKline. At the time he received these fees, Nemeroff had been principal investigator of a $3.9 million NIH grant evaluating five medications for depression manufactured by GlaxoSmithKline.

In 2008, for the first time, Grassley asked the American Psychiatric Association to disclose how much of its annual budget came from drug industry funds. The APA said that industry contributed 28% of its budget ($14 million at that time), mainly through paid advertising in APA journals and funds for continuing medical education.

Fundraising 
According to the nonpartisan OpenSecrets, in 2010, the industries that have been the largest contributors to Grassley during his political career are health professionals ($1 million in contributions), insurance industry ($997,674), lawyers/law firms ($625,543) and pharmaceuticals/health products ($538,680). His largest corporate donors have been Blue Cross Blue Shield (insurance), Amgen (biotech company) and Wells Fargo (bank).

Electoral history 

1978 Iowa 3rd District United States Congressional Election

1976 Iowa 3rd District United States Congressional Election

1974 Iowa 3rd District United States Congressional Election

1974 Iowa 3rd District United States Congressional Republican Primary Election

1972 Iowa House of Representatives 37th District Election

1970 Iowa House of Representatives 10th District Election

1966 Iowa House of Representatives Butler District Election

1964 Iowa House of Representatives Butler District Election

1962 Iowa House of Representatives Butler District Election

1960 Iowa House of Representatives Butler District Election

1958 Iowa House of Representatives Butler District Election

Personal life 
Grassley and Barbara Ann Speicher married on August 22, 1954. They have five children: Lee, Wendy, Robin, Michele, and Jay. Grassley is a member of the Family, the organization that organizes the National Prayer Breakfast. His grandson, Pat Grassley, is a member of the Iowa House of Representatives. Grassley is also known for his widely reported, long-running "feud" with the History channel; he has consistently accused the network of featuring little actual history programming.

According to OpenSecrets, Grassley's net worth was more than $7.5 million as of 2018.

Awards 
In 2003, Grassley's alma mater, the University of Northern Iowa, selected him for honoris causa membership in Omicron Delta Kappa, the National Leadership Honor Society. In 2009, the National Center for Health Research gave Grassley the Health Policy Hero award for his 2004 oversight of legislative reforms and accountability of the United States Food and Drug Administration (FDA). In 2010, The Hill named Grassley and Max Baucus the hardest-working members of Congress.

Notes

References

Further reading 
 Eve Fairbanks, "Earnest Goes to Washington", The New Republic, September 10, 2007

External links 

 
 Senator Chuck Grassley official United States Senate site
 Grassley for Senate
 
 

|-

|-

|-

|-

|-

|-

|-

|-

|-

|-

|-

|-

|-

|-

|-

|-

|-

|-

|-

|-

|-

|-

|-

|-

|-

|-

|-

1933 births
21st-century American politicians
Baptists from Iowa
Baptists from the United States
Intelligent design advocates
Living people
Republican Party members of the Iowa House of Representatives
People from Butler County, Iowa
Presidents pro tempore of the United States Senate
Republican Party members of the United States House of Representatives from Iowa
Republican Party United States senators from Iowa
University of Iowa alumni
University of Northern Iowa alumni
Grand Cordons of the Order of the Rising Sun
American Freemasons